The BPost Bank Trophy 2013–2014 is a season long cyclo-cross competition which began on 13 October with the GP Mario De Clercq and will end on 23 February in Oostmalle.

This edition follows the ranking system introduced the year before, using time instead of points.

Calendar

Ranking (top 10)

Results

Ronse

Oudenaarde

Hasselt

Essen

Wuustwezel

Baal

Lille

Oostmalle

References

Cyclo-cross BPost Bank Trophy
2013 in cyclo-cross
2014 in cyclo-cross